Neelbad is a village in the Bhopal district of Madhya Pradesh, India. It is located in the Huzur tehsil and the Phanda block. It is near IISER Bhopal, between Rasuliya Pathar and Barkheda Salam.

Demographics 

According to the 2011 census of India, Neelbad has 165 households. The effective literacy rate (i.e. the literacy rate of population excluding children aged 6 and below) is 35.2%.

References 

Villages in Huzur tehsil